Jenny Pagliaro ( 1984 - 26 March 2019) was the lead singer of the Los Angeles-based Americana duo Roses and Cigarettes. She died of breast cancer at the age of 35.

Career 
Pagliaro was born in Massachusetts and moved to California in 2004. In 2009 she auditioned for The Voice (American TV series) and was not selected. In 2015 she formed a band with guitarist Angela Petrilli and it was named Roses & Cigarettes. The duo released an eponymous album in that same year.

She was diagnosed with stage II Metastatic breast cancer just as plans were being made to tour in support of the album in 2015: she immediately underwent treatment. In 2016 her cancer came back and was then diagnosed as stage IV. Pagliaro decided to continue with her plans for a tour despite the cancer. Her music with partner Angela Petrilli was well received. Rolling Stone Magazine called her performance on the song "Fast as I Can" one of the 10 Best Country and Americana Songs of the Week in February 2019.

Pagliaro died at her home in Santa Monica, Calif. on 26 March 2019.

References

External links 
Fast As I Can by Roses & Cigarettes

1984 births
2019 deaths
Women singer-songwriters
People from Massachusetts
21st-century American women singers
21st-century American singers
Deaths from cancer in California